Dumitru Budianschi (born 2 September 1961) is the Minister of Finance of the Republic of Moldova.

References

1961 births
Living people
Politicians from Chișinău
Government ministers of Moldova